Mateel Howe Farnham (1883, Atchison, Kansas — 1957, Norwalk, Connecticut) was an American novelist. The daughter of Edgar "E.W." Watson Howe and Clara L. (Frank) Howe, she wed Dwight T. Farnham (1881-1950) in 1910.

Books
Rebellion, 1927
Marsh-fire, 1928 
Wild Beauty, 1930
Battle Royal, 1931
Lost Laughter, 1933 
Ex-Love, 1937
The Tollivers, 1944

Filmography
Wayward, based on Wild Beauty

References

1883 births
1957 deaths
People from Atchison, Kansas